Robert LoCascio (born May 15, 1968) is an American businessman. He is the founder and CEO of LivePerson, which offers brand-consumer messaging for web, social, and mobile.  He is a founding member of the NYC Entrepreneurs Council of the Partnership for New York City and a mentor of the NYC Venture Fellows, a joint initiative formed by the 92Y and the NYCEDC which is designed to help the next generation of global entrepreneurs succeed in New York City. Passionate about community and helping others, Robert founded FeedingNYC, a volunteer-based non-profit hunger-relief project. Robert also maintains a column in Huffington Post that features contributions to the greater community, and a column in Inc Magazine that covers best practices for innovative business leaders.

Early life and education 

LoCascio was born on May 15, 1968, in Bayshore, New York, the son of Peter LoCascio and Connie LoCascio (née Immordino). LoCascio comes from a family of entrepreneurs. He graduated from St. John the Baptist High School in West Islip, New York in 1986 and graduated with a BBA from Loyola University Maryland in 1990.

Professional career 

After graduation, LoCascio briefly worked for Elders IXL in the international chemicals trading division  but after six months, the company experienced cutbacks and he got laid off, vowing to never again work for anyone but himself.
In 1991, LoCascio started his first company, Sybarite Media, Inc., a developer of interactive public kiosks that integrated interactive video features with advertising and commerce capabilities, by charging his initial $50,000 investment on his credit cards.  Due in part to the rise of the Internet, the interactive kiosk business did not succeed and was subsequently shut down in 1995. In 1995, LoCascio founded LivePerson.

"I started LivePerson after one of my first experiences on the Internet. I had a product question on a site, but there was no one online that I could connect with. I had to dial a number, wait, and explain my whole dilemma. It was a very disconnected and disruptive experience.  I thought the Internet was created so that we could "connect" with human beings, but what I experienced was the opposite. This created that ‘light bulb’ moment for me and helped set into motion what is now LivePerson."

LoCascio took LivePerson public in April 2000, with an IPO of $8 a share. As one of the last companies to go public before the crash, he took drastic measures in cutting staff and expenses to stay afloat after the market fell. "It was a terrible time, and we weren't celebrating, to say the least," LoCascio said. "But it saved us." During the worst of times, LoCascio lived out of his office space, sleeping on a couch that still sits in the LivePerson office today. The stock would eventually rebound, returning to its original stock price almost 10 years later, as LivePerson gained hold in the market being dubbed “the thriving alley survivor you’ve never heard of” by Crain's New York.

In 2011, LivePerson was named one of Fortune's 100 Fastest Growing Companies and one of Forbes’ 25 Fastest Growing Tech Companies. LoCascio currently employs over 1,000 people worldwide, and credits his recruiting philosophy as a main element in the company's success. He looks for two things: skill and will. In an article for Inc Magazine, he wrote “The most valuable employees are the ones that have more than the right skills for the job. They have the will to do the job with passion.

On October 1, 2015, LoCascio rang the opening bell at NASDAQ to celebrate 20 years in business, and shared his vision for LivePerson’s future: creating a world without 1-800 numbers, a world without ever being put on hold.

LoCascio is now one of the longest-standing technology founding CEOs and has been profiled in Forbes’ series of Thought Leaders Changing the Business Landscape and The New York Times’ Corner Office, and is the winner of the 2015 Smart CEO Circle of Excellence Award in Technology. In 2020, LivePerson was named one of Fast Company's Most Innovative Companies in the World.

LoCascio is the founder of EqualAI, a nonprofit organization focused on reducing unconscious bias in the development and use of artificial intelligence. LoCascio founded the organization in partnership with Arianna Huffington, Jimmy Wales, Justine Cassell, and Baroness Lane Fox. It is led by Miriam Vogel, a former White House official who led the creation and development of the Implicit Bias Training for Federal Law Enforcement.

Philanthropy 

Beyond his business, LoCascio is the founder of the Dream Big Foundation, which started in 2001. Its first program was FeedingNYC, a hunger-relief project which delivers thousands of boxed meals to sheltered families in need throughout New York City each Thanksgiving.  FeedingNYC was launched during the aftermath of 9/11 in the hopes of making a difference within the local community. Since 2001, over 80,000 Thanksgiving meals have been delivered to families in need.

In 2014 the Dream Big Foundation expanded and launched a new program that will fund, mentor and coach budding entrepreneurs from the Brownsville, Brooklyn community. The first entrepreneurs that the foundation is funding will open the Dream Big Entrepreneur Café on 3 Belmont Ave, Brownsville, Brooklyn. In his Huffington Post column, LoCascio writes “Providing these budding entrepreneurs with those tools and resources to turn their idea into a successful business is the key to growing this community from the inside out, rather than becoming a casualty of gentrification. The café is scheduled to open in Spring, 2016. This work earned him the title of "Person of the Day" by Huffington Post in 2010.  Robert is also active in the arts and works closely with the Salon program of the Juilliard School.

Personal life

LoCascio married Clarissa Weidner in 2015.

References 

1968 births
American technology chief executives
Loyola University Maryland alumni
Living people
Businesspeople from New York City
HuffPost writers and columnists
People from Bay Shore, New York